The Royal and Distinguished Spanish Order of Charles III, originally Royal and Much Distinguished Order of Charles III (originally ) was established by the King of Spain Charles III by means of the Royal Decree of 19 September 1771, with the motto Virtuti et mérito. Its objective is to reward people for their actions in benefit to Spain and the Crown. 

Since its creation, and second to the Order of the Golden Fleece, it has been the most distinguished civil award that can be granted in Spain, despite its categorisation as a military order.

History
Although the royal decree of creation was in September 1771, Charles III did not make the orders public that would regulate the distinction until 24 October. The reason for this lies in the origin of the Order. The future king and prince of Asturias, Charles IV, had been married for five years with no offspring, reason for which when his first child was born his grandfather, Charles III, wanted to leave evidence of his gratitude to God — to whom he declared having prayed to while waiting for the continuation of the dynasty — and, specifically, to the Virgin Mary in his advocacy of the Immaculate Conception and of whom he declared himself the profoundly devout king. Like so, on the given date, when the king's daughter-in-law assisted the first religious affair with the child in her arms, the king wanted to publish the laws of concession, naming himself "Great Master of the Order" and giving his heirs, as long as they held the title "King of Spain", the same treatment and position. Although the child and various brothers died soon after, Charles III maintained his agreement, and the number of Crosses given was greatly reduced at the monarch's regret.

The orders of creation demanded two requirements: to be "worthy and affectionate of His Highness". Two classes were created: the Knights Grand Cross and the Knights, also known as caballeros pensionados ("Pensioner Knights", or simply pensionados, "pensioners"), the monarch being discretional with his authorization, although it was limited to sixty of the former and two-hundred of the latter.

Pope Clement XIV, on 21 February 1772 recognized the Order through papal bull and bestowed upon it the religious benefits, to the Order as well as its members, giving the Great Master all the capacity to decree in religious matters regarding the members, even absolution and apostolic blessing. The benefits of the members of the Order were of a different nature, later increasing with Pius VI.

The insignias of the Order have varied throughout time, but have invariably maintained some original features: blue silk band with white design, an eight-point cross with the image of the Immaculate Conception, the motto Virtuti et Merito and the figure of Charles III.

In 1783 the third class of Supernumerary Knights was created. At this moment the duties and requirements of the titles were specified: they needed to have "pure and noble blood" up to their great-grandparents, as was regulated by the Castilian Fueros and the other valid laws. Those received by the Order took an oath for loyalty towards the king, his family, and the protection of the goods of the Royal House, recognizing him as Great Master, live and die in catholic faith, accepting as indisputable the Mystery of the Immaculate Conception, and attending and receiving communion at mass at least once a year.

The government of the Order became more and more complex, although in truth it was the monarch and the treasurer who granted authorization and retributions. The king was especially careful to incorporate into the Order theologians of the Crown that investigated the mysteries of the Virgin Mary, in some cases the clergymen being greater in number than the knights and nobles of which it was made up. The meetings were held in the Church of San Gil in Madrid twice a year, one coinciding with the Immaculate Conception and the other with the All Saints' Day. With Charles IV of Spain some reforms were made to the dress and the distribution of colours in the distinctions. The Peninsular War caused two institutions to attribute the faculty of the government of the Order: Joseph Bonaparte and the Suprime Central Junta. In the end, these were abolished by the Joseph. The colours of the band of the Order were adopted by some members of the Provisional Government of Argentina to signify their adhesion to King Ferdinand VII and would later come to represent the movement for independence.

In 1815, Ferdinand introduced a new star for the Pensioner Knights, showing the reverse of the badge. 

The Order was formally converted to a civil order in 1847. The classes of Pensioner Knights and Supernumerary Knights were transformed into the classes of Commander by Number and Knight, respectively. The Knights Grand Cross and Commanders by Number were limited to 120 and 300 respectively, while the new class of Commanders and the Knights are unlimited until today. In 1878, the Knight of Collar was introduced as the highest class of the order, limited to 60 recipients.

The order's current regulations were approved by Royal Decree 1051 of 2002. The regulation sets the objective of the order as a means of "rewarding the citizens who, with their effort, initiative and work, have brought a distinguished and extraordinary service to the Nation". The Grand Master of the order is the monarch of Spain, currently King Felipe VI.

The Grand Cross

The Grand Cross of the Order of Charles III is reserved for those who, having completed relevant service to Spain, having been Presidents of the Congress of Deputies, the Senate, the Constitutional Court of the Supreme Judicial Council, the Supreme Court, Ministers or other senior officials of the state. The maximum number of Grand Crosses are limited to one hundred, not counting those accorded to Ministers.

Knights Collar and Knights Grand Cross of the Order are entitled to be addressed with the style The Most Excellent in front of their name. Other members are entitled to the style of The Most Illustrious.

Grades
The orders are currently conferred in the following grades: 
Collar (Collar) – restricted to 25 Spanish citizens (not including members of Spain's royal family).
Knight Grand Cross (Gran-Cruz) – restricted to 100 Spanish citizens (limit excludes government ministers).
Commander by Number (Encomienda de Número) - restricted to 200 Spanish citizens (limit excludes government ministers).
Commander, optional Dame's Bow (Encomienda, Lazo de Dama opcional).
Knight's Cross (Cruz).

There are no restrictions on the number of foreigners that may be appointed to any of the grades.

References

Real Decreto 1051/2002, de 11 de octubre, por el que se aprueba el Reglamento de la Real y Distinguida Orden Española de Charles III. (as amended)

External links

Orders of chivalry of Spain
Orders of chivalry awarded to heads of state, consorts and sovereign family members